Kitimat River Provincial Park is a provincial park in British Columbia, Canada. It was established on May 17, 2004, and is 57 ha. in size.

References

North Coast of British Columbia
Kitimat Ranges
Provincial parks of British Columbia
Year of establishment missing